Ringen oyf der Neshome (Rings on the Soul) is Eli Schechtman's autobiographical novel in two volumes. Volume 1 was published in 1981 and volume 2 was published in 1988. The novel deals with the lives of Jews in Russia and in Israel from the beginning until the end of the twentieth century.

Overview and publication history

The autobiographical novel Ringen oyf der neshome (Rings on the Soul) was written by Eli Schechtman in Israel in two stages. The first two books (Vol 1) were printed in 1981. Then Eli Schechtman had completed work on the 7-volume novel Erev, published in 1983. Only after that, the following two books (Vol 2) were written and published in 1988. The first volume of novel was translated by  into Hebrew and was published twice: the first part was published in 1981 under name Tabaot beneshema, the second one – in 1983 under name Leilot shel kohavim kvuim , and whole volume – in the Classic series in 1992 under name Tabaot beneshema.
The first volume was published under the name Кольца на душе in 2001. The second volume was published under the name Вспахать бездну in 2012.

Plot summary

Depicts the life of the Yiddish writer Eli Schechtman from his childhood until his arrival to Jerusalem. Through this autobiographical account, themes of Jewish identity, life under the Soviet regime, as well as culture war between Yiddish and Hebrew are depicted.
The novel ends with the words:
"I stand between two worlds and generations,
beth the old wound and the new pain.
Alone,
Completely alone."

Critical reception

This autobiographical novel was not noticed by the authors of the book A Thousand Years of Ashkenazi Culture, which commented about the "inability of the Yiddish culture as a whole ... to write a real autobiography, to reveal your "I" in historical time.

M.Kopeliovich wrote: "The title of the novel conveys the resemblance of a human soul to a tree trunk. And just as tree rings mark the continuous growth of a tree, so “rings on the soul” mark one after another stages of spiritual growth, closely associated with life's trials. Every turn of life, be it joyful or disastrous, cuts a new ring into the soul of the impressionable, as befits a writer ..."

In 1980, Ehud Ben-Ezer had published in the Israeli newspaper Maariv the article about Eli Schechtman under name "Rings of fire in a Jewish soul".

Translations of novel Ringen oyf der Neshome
Eli Schechtman

References

Further reading
 USHMM 
 Itshe Goldberg, Eli Shekhtman, 1908—1996, Yidishe kultur 11–12, (1996)
 Estraikh, Gennady. 2010. Shekhtman, Eli. YIVO Encyclopedia of Jews in Eastern Europe
 Gennady Estraikh, Yiddish in the Cold War, Oxford, 2008,

External links
 
 
 Кольца на душе, Vol 1,Part 1 (in russian, performs Alma Shin)
 Кольца на душе, Vol 1,Part 2 (in russian, performs Alma Shin)

1981 novels
1988 novels
Autobiographical novels
20th-century Israeli novels
Yiddish-language literature
Novels by Eli Schechtman
Yiddish culture in Israel